Zhao Jiping (b. Pingliang, Gansu, China, August 1945) is a Chinese composer from Shaanxi. He is best known for his film scores for the Fifth Generation Chinese director Zhang Yimou.  He is the current Honorary Chairman of the Chinese Musicians’ Association.

Zhao studied at the Central Conservatory of Music in Beijing.

Film scores
Yellow Earth
A Chinese Odyssey
Red Sorghum
Raise the Red Lantern
The Story of Qiu Ju
Farewell, My Concubine
To Live
The Water Margin
The Emperor and the Assassin
Three Kingdoms

References

External links
Unofficial Website for Chinese Composer Zhao JiPing
Article about Zhao Jiping
Silk Road Project biography
 

1945 births
Living people
People's Republic of China composers
Chinese film score composers
People from Pingliang
Place of birth missing (living people)
Musicians from Gansu
People's Republic of China politicians from Gansu
Chinese Communist Party politicians from Gansu